Stelios Mygiakis (born 5 May 1952) is a Greek Greco-Roman wrestler. He won and Olympic gold medal and is the first Greek to become an Olympic Champion in wrestling. Mygiakis also won a gold medal at both the European Wrestling Championships and Mediterranean Games. He was named the 1980 Greek Male Athlete of the Year.
In 1971 Stylianos becomes Greek champion, was used in the featherweight and in the same year for the first time at an international championship, the World Cup in Sofia for the first time. There had Stylianos, who was only 19 years old, still belonging pay dearly, for he lost both fights, he had to deny prematurely. In the 1972 European Championship in Katowice but Sylianos already achieved three wins and reached a good 6th place. At the Olympic Games in Munich in 1972 Stylianos go again three wins, including one over the Soviet Favorites Jemal Megrelischwili which he came on the 7th Place.

Over the next six years to 1978 Stylianos was in almost every European and World championship at the start. It him but never managed to win a medal. His best results were the 4th place at the World Cup 1974 in Katowice, the 5th place at the World Cup 1978 in Mexico City and the 6th place at the European Championship 1975 in Ludwigshafen am Rhein, each featherweight. For all international championships this year showed that while Stylianos could compete well against the mass of the starters, against the absolute tip -rounder, almost without exception came from the former Eastern Bloc countries at that time, had no chance. Georgi Markov from Bulgaria, Kazimierz Lipień from Poland, Nelson Dawidjan, Boris Kramarenko from the USSR and László Réczi from Hungary are mentioned here as examples.

In 1979, Stylianos managed but then still, surprisingly for some, the breakthrough. At the European Championships this year in Bucharest, although he lost in the 2nd round again against the Soviet wrestler Boris Kramarenko, but thanks to a free lot and three wins over top-class opponents like the Turk Metin Eser, the Poland Kazimierz Lipień and Hungary István Tóth and fact that Kramarenko again losing to Toth, made him the European champions.

The climax of the career of Stylianos Migiakis but should the 1980 Olympic Games in Moscow. He won among others again Kazimierz Lipień, Boris and István Tóth Kramarenko and was Olympic champion in spite of a double defeat against Lars Malmkvist from Sweden.

After finished Stylianos, who was in his career also eightfold Greek featherweight champion, his career as an active wrestler.

Olympics
Mygiakis competed at the 1980 Summer Olympics in Moscow and won a gold medal in Greco-Roman wrestling, the featherweight class.

References

External links

1952 births
Living people
Sportspeople from Rethymno
Greek male sport wrestlers
Olympic wrestlers of Greece
Wrestlers at the 1972 Summer Olympics
Wrestlers at the 1976 Summer Olympics
Wrestlers at the 1980 Summer Olympics
Wrestlers at the 1984 Summer Olympics
Olympic gold medalists for Greece
Olympic medalists in wrestling
Medalists at the 1980 Summer Olympics
Mediterranean Games gold medalists for Greece
Mediterranean Games silver medalists for Greece
Competitors at the 1975 Mediterranean Games
Competitors at the 1979 Mediterranean Games
Competitors at the 1983 Mediterranean Games
Mediterranean Games medalists in wrestling
European Wrestling Championships medalists
20th-century Greek people